Hypatopa bilobata is a moth in the family Blastobasidae. It is found in Costa Rica.

The length of the forewings is 5–7 mm. The forewings are brown intermixed with pale-brown scales and a few dark-brown scales. The hindwings are translucent pale brown, gradually darkening towards the apex.

Etymology
The specific name is derived from Latin bi (meaning two) and lob (meaning lobe) together referring to the two apicolateral lobes of the anellus.

References

Moths described in 2013
Hypatopa